Martial arts were included as events during the 2018 Asian Games. Two games included pencak silat and sambo.

Medal table

Participating nations

Pencak silat

Sambo

List of medalists

References

External links 
Pencak Silat Results Book
Sambo Results Book

 
 
Sports at the Asian Games